John Ackroyd may refer to:

 John Ackroyd (footballer, born 1868) (1868–?), footballer for Grimsby Town and Rotherham Town
 John Ackroyd (footballer, born 1895) (1895–?), footballer for Exeter City, Grimsby Town and Rotherham County
 John Ackroyd (designer), designer of the world land speed record car Thrust2
 John Arthur Ackroyd (died 2016), American serial killer and rapist